Stanley Joseph "Stan" Lynch (born May 21, 1955) is an American musician, songwriter and record producer. He was the original  drummer for Tom Petty and the Heartbreakers for 18 years until his departure in 1994.

Early years 
Lynch was born in Cincinnati, Ohio, U.S., and moved to Gainesville, Florida, in the early 1960s. He began playing music as a small child. As a teenager growing up near Gainesville, Lynch determined that he would find a way to make a living with music. "As a kid I had very little opportunity. I was a marginal student. I wasn't going to college. My parents didn't have money."

"I played guitar and piano, and I always thought I was going to be a guitar player," said Lynch. "The drums were sort of a happy accident. I didn't really think that they would be my ticket out of the ghetto. Choosing to be a musician back then was not like choosing a job, but an entire lifestyle. My father looked at me as if I were going to wear a dress and dance in the circus."

Lynch was always involved in fights at school so his friends reasoned that the high-strung youth might be able to rip the aggression with drums. His parents made him take lessons before they bought him a kit, and he recalls with a laugh, "as soon as I got my first set they took up tennis—they just split, and I don't blame them."

The Heartbreakers 
Lynch started to work with various Florida bands, among them Styrophoam Soule and Road Turkey, and when he was 15 he met Ron Blair, who was six years older than Lynch. "I remember he accused me of stealing an amp from him. Hell, I didn't steal it. I was roadieing for him!" Drums didn't absorb all of Lynch's feistiness as his parents had hoped, although he stayed in school long enough to graduate from P.K. Yonge School in 1973.

Lynch moved to Los Angeles, and hooked up again with fellow Floridian Ron Blair, during a recording session set up by Benmont Tench in 1976. The session also included Jacksonville native Mike Campbell. Benmont called Tom Petty, also from Gainesville, to ask for some help with some vocals. While they were taking a break Petty looked into the recording studio and thought to himself "this should be my band". Petty had come out to LA with his band Mudcrutch, which Tench and Campbell were originally a part of, and had a recording contract. But once in LA the producers decided they were not keen on the rest of the band, so it broke up, leaving Petty basically a solo act — something he was not happy about. But because he had the record deal already, after the break Petty went back into the studio and started his pitch. By the end of the evening, Lynch and the rest walked out as Tom Petty and The Heartbreakers.

After being with the Heartbreakers, Lynch calmed down. "Tom told me, 'Look man, you can call anybody anything you want...but you can't lay a hand on anyone in this band.' "  Even though he was still in the band in 1989, Lynch did not perform on any songs on Petty's solo album Full Moon Fever, even though Campbell, Tench and Epstein did.

For his part, Lynch felt that he had just begun to play well on the band's fourth and fifth albums, Hard Promises and Long After Dark. "[I'd] gotten looser, more pliable over the years," he commented. "When I listen to our first couple of albums, I think that I sound stiff." As Lynch's ability increased, so did the offers to play with other artists, creating experience that covers a wide variety of musical territory. Lynch contributed to albums by the following artists:

The Amazing Delores
The Blasters
Jackson Browne
T-Bone Burnett
The Byrds
Belinda Carlisle
Bob Dylan
The Eagles
Elliot Easton
Eurythmics
Aretha Franklin
Don Henley
Jackopierce
Freedy Johnston
Jim Lauderdale
Eric Martin
The Mavericks
John Mellencamp
Roger McGuinn
Kevin Montgomery
Scotty Moore
Stevie Nicks
The Nudes
Rank and File
Timothy B. Schmit
Del Shannon
Todd Sharp
Henry Lee Summer
Toto
Warren Zevon

Departure from the Heartbreakers 
Lynch left the group in 1994. His last gig with the Heartbreakers was on October 2, 1994, at the Bridge School Benefit Concert in Mountain View, California. It was immediately following this gig that Lynch left the band due to musical and personal differences with Petty. After his departure, Lynch moved back to Florida, where he partnered with longtime friend Don Henley to help put together the Eagles' reunion album Hell Freezes Over. He also has toured with the Eagles.

Lynch gave away his drum sets and now works as a producer and songwriter in St. Augustine, Florida. He teaches children the drums a few times a week at a high school friend's music store in Gainesville.

Acts Lynch has produced include The Band, the Eagles, Don Henley, Jackopierce, Joe 90, Scotty Moore, and Sister Hazel.

As a songwriter, he has co-written with or written for numerous acts, including Matraca Berg, Meredith Brooks, The Fabulous Thunderbirds, The Jeff Healey Band, James House, June Pointer, Eddie Money, Toto, Tora Tora, Sister Hazel, Ringo Starr and the Mavericks.

Tim McGraw recorded "Back When", a song Lynch wrote with Stephony Smith and Jeff Stevens, for his album Live Like You Were Dying. The song went to No. 1 in early December 2004.

Lynch reunited with his former bandmates in 2002 when they were inducted into the Rock and Roll Hall of Fame, playing "American Girl" and "Mary Jane's Last Dance".

Tom Petty had the following to say about Lynch, included in his 2005 book, Conversations with Tom Petty:

In 2022, Lynch accepted an invitation from Heartbreakers guitarist Mike Campbell to fill in for drummer Matt Laug for several shows on tour with Campbell's band The Dirty Knobs. The two had not previously met or spoken in twenty years, other than a brief phone call following Petty's death. Lynch stated he would be open to playing with the other three original members of The Heartbreakers in the future.

Personal life 
Lynch was involved in a five-year relationship with actress Louise "Wish" Foley whom he met while he and the rest of the band were on set shooting a production for the Tom Petty song "Don't Come Around Here No More".  Foley played the main blond haired Alice in Wonderland character in the video. She was also in the video 'Make It Better (Forget About Me)'

References

External links
 Berkery, Patrick. Stan Lynch, Modern Drummer, May 2008 Issue (retrieved February 3, 2010)
 Moore, Jayne. Renowned Heartbreakers Drummer Stan Lynch Becomes Top Songwriter & Producer, Songwriter Universe Magazin (retrieved February 3, 2010)

1955 births
Record producers from Ohio
American rock drummers
Songwriters from Ohio
Living people
Musicians from Cincinnati
Musicians from Florida
Tom Petty and the Heartbreakers members
Record producers from Florida
Jewish rock musicians
20th-century American drummers
American male drummers